The 2017–18 Memphis Tigers men's basketball team represented the University of Memphis in the 2017–18 NCAA Division I men's basketball season, the 97th season of Tiger basketball, the second under head coach Tubby Smith, and the fifth as members of the American Athletic Conference. They played their home games at the FedEx Forum. They finished the season 21–13, 10–8 in AAC play to finish in fifth place. They defeated Tulsa in the AAC tournament before losing to Cincinnati in the semifinals.

On March 14, 2018, the school fired head coach Tubby Smith after two years. On March 20, the school hired former Memphis player and NBA star Penny Hardaway as coach.

Previous season
The Tigers finished the 2016–17 season 19–13, 9–9 in AAC play to finish in a tie for fifth place. They lost in the quarterfinals of the AAC tournament to UCF. Despite having 19 wins, they did not participate in a postseason tournament.

Offseason

Departures 
Following the 2016–17 season, Dedric Lawson, K.J. Lawson, and Markel Crawford, the Tigers' three leading scorers and rebounders, announced they would transfer from Memphis.

Incoming transfers

2017 recruiting class

2018 recruiting class

Roster

Schedule and results

|-
!colspan=6 style=| Exhibition

|-
!colspan=6 style=| Non-conference regular season

|-
!colspan=6 style=| AAC regular season

|-
!colspan=12 style=| AAC tournament

References

Memphis
Memphis Tigers men's basketball seasons
Memphis
Memphis